is a Japanese male volleyball player. He was part of the Japan men's national volleyball team. On club level, he plays for Osaka Blazers Sakai.

Awards

Individual 
 V.League 2020–21 season — V.League Honor Award
2022 Asian Men's Volleyball Cup - Best Setter

References

External links
 profile at FIVB.org

1987 births
Living people
Japanese men's volleyball players
Place of birth missing (living people)